Richard Barry Walley (born 1953) OAM is a Nyungar man, one of Australia's leading Aboriginal performers, musicians and writers, who has been a campaigner for the Indigenous cause.  Walley is also a visual artist.

Life and career
He began his work in social justice for Indigenous Australians in the Perth region, Nyungar country, at a young age. By 23 he was chairing Western Australia's Aboriginal Advisory Board, while also involved in the formation or operation of the Aboriginal Housing Board, Aboriginal Medical Service, Aboriginal Legal Service, Aboriginal Alcoholism Committee, Aboriginal Sports Foundation and the New Era Aboriginal Fellowship.

He is known for helping to develop the modern Australian welcome to country ritual, when in 1976 he and Ernie Dingo and created a ceremony to welcome a group of Māori artists who were participating in the Perth International Arts Festival.

In 1978, he founded the Middar Aboriginal Theatre with three friends, including Ernie Dingo, who he had met playing basketball. Walley had realised early the powerful potential of theatre to raise issues and bring messages to the broader community, black and white. Aiming to take the Nyungar culture from the south-west corner of Australia to as many people as possible, the Middar group went on to perform in 32 countries, on every continent, to live audiences totalling almost ten million people.

After acting in theatre and TV, Walley went on to further develop his theatre skills, holding the role of either director or assistant director in 10 productions in theatre and TV from 1982 to 1993. Several of these productions took place in the United States and the UK. During this period Walley also wrote several screenplays. In March 1990 the Aboriginal National Theatre Trust staged the world premiere of his play Munjong, directed by Vivian Walker (son of Oodgeroo Noonuccal),  at the Victorian Arts Centre.

In 1993 Walley was awarded the Order of Australia Medal for his contribution to the performing arts and Nyungar culture.

Walley is also a renowned didgeridoo player and has produced a six CD collection of didgeridoo music that is inspired by the six seasons of the Nyungar calendar. He has played didgeridoo live at London's Royal Albert Hall, as well as in Greece, Slovenia, Japan, Mexico, the US and Canada.

From 2000 he served as Chair of the Australia Council's Aboriginal and Torres Strait Islander Arts Board, a position he had held previously between 1992 and 1996. 

In 2001, Murdoch University in Western Australia recognised his contribution to Nyungar culture and the wider community with an honorary Doctorate of Letters.

In 2001 he performed in Westminster Abbey for dignitaries, including Queen Elizabeth II, as part Australia's Centenary of Federation celebrations. In the same year, he worked with Carlos Santana with music for his Supernatural Evening with Santana and contributed to the 2000 Summer Olympics opening ceremony.

In 2003, he released Two Tribes, a collaboration with a group of artists, an eclectic selection of songs combining traditional Indigenous music with contemporary styles such as rap and hip hop.

Walley has been involved as director, designer, writer, musician, dancer and actor with a range of stage and television productions, including The Dreamers (1982), A Fortunate Life (1984), Bullies House (1985), Coordah (1985), Australian Mosaic (1988), Jackaroo (1990), Balaan Balaan Gwdtha (1992) and Close to the Bone (1993).

He toured with the John Butler Trio delivering a unique Indigenous and spoken word performance, Son of MotherEarth.

Walley is a fluent speaker of the Nyungar language, and an accomplished visual artist.

In 2013 Walley designed a football jumper for the Fremantle Football Club to wear during the Australian Football League's Indigenous Round. In 2016 he was appointed as the club's honorary number 1 ticketholder.

Discography

Albums

Awards

West Australian Music Industry Awards
The West Australian Music Industry Awards (WAMIs) are annual awards presented to the local contemporary music industry, put on annually by the Western Australian Music Industry Association Inc (WAM). Richard Walley has won one awards.
 
 (wins only)
|-
| 2006
| Richard Walley
| Best Indigenous Act 
| 
|-

References

External links
 Richard Walley's website

1953 births
Living people
Indigenous Australian musicians
Musicians from Western Australia
Australian male stage actors
Indigenous Australian actors
Recipients of the Medal of the Order of Australia
Noongar people
Australian indigenous rights activists
People from Meekatharra, Western Australia